Kadingir or Ka Dingir is the Sumerian name for Babylon.

It may also refer to:
Kadingir, a fictional superweapon in the anime television series Symphogear
Kadingir Sanctum, a location in the 2016 video game DOOM
Ka Dingel, a distortion of the original Sumerian word, pertaining to the penultimate dungeon in the 1996 video game  Wild Arms